Chowchilla is a city in Madera County, California, United States. The city's population was 19,039 at the 2020 census.

The city is the location of two prisons: Central California Women's Facility and Valley State Prison.

Etymology

The name "Chowchilla" is derived from the indigenous American tribe of Chaushila (the spelling is inconsistent in reference guides), a Yokuts Indian tribe which once lived in the area. The name evidently translates as "murderers" and is apparently a reference to the warlike nature of the Chaushila tribe. It is also to be known among the Yokuts tribes later on to be associated with "bravery". The Chaushila Indians were inadvertently responsible for the first white men "discovering" Yosemite Valley, which occurred when they were being pursued by a band of whites. References to the tribe still abound in Chowchilla, and until 2016 the town's high school used the moniker "Redskins" as their mascot.

History
The first post office at Chowchilla opened in 1912 and the city incorporated eleven years later, in 1923.

1976 bus kidnapping 

Chowchilla made national news on July 15, 1976, when 26 children and their school bus driver were kidnapped and held in a buried moving van at a quarry in Livermore, California. The driver and some of the children were able to escape and notify the quarry guard. All the victims returned unharmed. The quarry owner's son and two friends were convicted and sentenced to life in prison.

Geography

Ash Slough, a tributary of the Fresno River, runs along the northern edge of the city.

Demographics

Official population figures include inmates of two prisons.

Chowchilla is part of the Madera metropolitan statistical area.

2000
At the 2000 census there were 11,127 people in 2,562 households, including 1,908 families, in the city. The racial makeup of the city was 63.46% White, 10.26% Black or African American, 2.60% Native American, 1.32% Asian, 0.26% Pacific Islander, 16.16% from other races, and 5.94% from two or more races. Of the population, 28.20% were Hispanic or Latino of any race.
Of the 2,562 households 40.2% had children under the age of 18 living with them, 55.3% were married couples living together, 13.2% had a female householder with no husband present, and 25.5% were non-families; 21.9% of households were one person and 12.6% were one person aged 65 or older. The average household size was 2.94 and the average family size was 3.42.

The age distribution was 22.2% under the age of 18, 9.4% from 18 to 24, 42.8% from 25 to 44, 16.2% from 45 to 64, and 9.3% 65 or older. The median age was 34 years. For every 100 females, there were 51.1 males.  For every 100 females age 18 and over, there were 39.8 males.

The median household income was $30,729 and the median family income was $35,741. Males had a median income of $32,306 versus $20,538 for females. The per capita income for the city was $11,927. About 16.5% of families and 19.2% of the population were below the poverty line, including 27.1% of those under age 18 and 7.6% of those age 65 or over.

2010
At the 2010 census Chowchilla had a population of 18,720, including the prisons' inmates. The racial makeup of Chowchilla was 11,533 (61.6%) White, 2,358 (12.6%) African American, 376 (2.0%) Native American, 395 (2.1%) Asian, 37 (0.2%) Pacific Islander, 3,313 (17.7%) from other races, and 708 (3.8%) from two or more races. Hispanic or Latino of any race were 7,073 persons (37.8%).

The census reported that 11,311 people (60.4% of the population) lived in households, 6 (0%) lived in non-institutionalized group quarters, and 7,403 (39.5%) were institutionalized.

There were 3,673 households, 1,693 (46.1%) had children under the age of 18 living in them, 1,932 (52.6%) were opposite-sex married couples living together, 586 (16.0%) had a female householder with no husband present, 260 (7.1%) had a male householder with no wife present.  There were 275 (7.5%) unmarried opposite-sex partnerships, and 24 (0.7%) same-sex married couples or partnerships. 721 households (19.6%) were one person and 293 (8.0%) had someone living alone who was 65 or older. The average household size was 3.08. There were 2,778 families (75.6% of households); the average family size was 3.52.

The age distribution was 3,583 people (19.1%) under the age of 18, 2,048 people (10.9%) aged 18 to 24, 7,343 people (39.2%) aged 25 to 44, 4,429 people (23.7%) aged 45 to 64, and 1,317 people (7.0%) who were 65 or older. The median age was 34.7 years. For every 100 females, there were 42.7 males.  For every 100 females age 18 and over, there were 33.3 males.

There were 4,154 housing units at an average density of 542.2 per square mile, of the occupied units 1,966 (53.5%) were owner-occupied and 1,707 (46.5%) were rented. The homeowner vacancy rate was 6.2%; the rental vacancy rate was 7.9%. 5,920 people (31.6% of the population) lived in owner-occupied housing units and 5,391 people (28.8%) lived in rental housing units.

Climate
The climate of Chowchilla is Mediterranean. It receives an average of about 12 inches of precipitation per year. The wettest months are December, January, and February, with January being the wettest. Chowchilla has dry, hot summers, and mild to cool, rainy winters. Chowchilla experiences frequent fog from November to March and overcast days are common, especially in January. In 2005, Chowchilla had 20 consecutive cloudy, rainy days. There are days with moderate to heavy rain during the winter months. In January, the high temperature may drop as low as 45 °F (7 °C). During the summer, when there is usually no rain, the temperature may reach as high or higher than 110 °F (43 °C). Snow in Chowchilla is rare.

Government

The city is the location of two California Department of Corrections and Rehabilitation facilities, the Central California Women's Facility and Valley State Prison. Central California Women's houses the state's female death row.

Politics

Education
Three public school districts serve the residents of Chowchilla and the surrounding area, as well as one private school. Chowchilla Elementary School District (Grades K to 8th) and Chowchilla Union High School District (9th to 12th grade) make up the local public school system of the city proper. Alview-Dairyland Union School District (Grades K to 8th) serves nearby rural communities including Dairyland.

Chowchilla Elementary School District is made up of five school campuses and typically enrolls city residents, as well as residents from the nearby community of Fairmead. The Alview-Dairyland Union School District is composed of two rural area school campuses, and serves residents that reside outside of town. Upon completing 8th grade, students from both elementary districts are enrolled in the town's comprehensive high school, Chowchilla Union High School. The Chowchilla Union High School District also operates Gateway Continuation school and an Independent Study program.

The Chowchilla Elementary School District operates five schools, with student population distributed by grade level. Stephens School [Kindergarten], Fuller School [Grades 1 and 2], Ronald Reagan School [Grades 3 and 4], and Fairmead School [Grades 5 and 6] are elementary schools, and Wilson School [Grades 7 and 8] is the middle school.

Alview-Dairyland Union School District operates Alview Elementary School [Grades K through 3] and Dairyland Elementary School [Grades 4 through 8].

Transportation

Airport

The Chowchilla Airport, a municipal airport used for general aviation, is located southeast of the main part of the city.

Roads
Chowchilla is located along the Golden State Highway (California State Route 99 [SR 99]), which runs northwest–southeast, just northeast of the main part of the city.

Bus
Public transportation within the city of Chowchilla is provided by Chowchilla Area Transit (CATX), which is a dial-a-ride demand-responsive service with no fixed routes. CATX operates on weekdays with the exception of selected holidays. Inter-city connections are provided by the county via Madera County Connection, which operates one fixed route connecting Chowchilla with the county seat in Madera.

High-speed rail
Chowchilla Wye is planned to be the point where the California High-Speed Rail's main spine splits into two northern branches: one traveling to the San Francisco Bay Area, and the other continuing north to Sacramento.

Notable people
 Henry Farrell, screenwriter and novelist best known for What Ever Happened to Baby Jane? and Hush... Hush, Sweet Charlotte
 Ronald D. Moore, screenwriter and television producer best known for his work on Star Trek and the reimagined Battlestar Galactica television series
 Cameron Worrell, former NFL player for the Chicago Bears

Economy
Chowchilla commonly produces peaches and other soft fruits and vegetables. On September 29th and/or 30th, 2020, three  (Bactrocera zonata Saunders) were trapped here. This presents a tremendous hazard not only to the area but to the state, and indeed the entire country. Because the pest may spread from here to other countries, trading partners including the EU and New Zealand are also concerned. They are considering restricting importation of fruits and vegetables from the state. As a result the Secretary of CDFA, Karen Ross has declared a biosecurity emergency and eradication efforts using methyl eugenol lures are underway. Especially an immediate concern are California's $2.10b citrus-, $875m stonefruit-, and $1.19b tomato- industries.

The  (Amyelois transitella) is present here. The  (Goniozus legneri) is a parasitoid that was introduced to the state to control it, and is now widespread including in this area. The combination of both wasps here is producing greater NOW mortality than with either alone.

See also

 List of municipalities in California

References

External links

 
 From Sun to Darkness — The Chowchilla Kidnapping
 Madera Online - News for Madera & Chowchilla
 Madera Values Quarterly

 
Cities in Madera County, California
Incorporated cities and towns in California
1923 establishments in California
Populated places established in 1923